The Eli Rayner House is a historic house in Memphis, Tennessee, U.S.. It was built in 1856 for Eli Rayner, a planter, and his wife May A. Jones. The Rayner were well-connected: Rayner's first cousin was Kenneth Rayner, and their daughter Irene married Thomas B. Turley.

The house is a relatively sophisticated Late Greek Revival-style building, with "elegantly proportioned fluted columns capped with lotus leaf Corinthian capitals, supporting the pediment with simple scrolled triglyphs...."  A cast-iron balcony, original or from before 1900, is at the second floor level within the two-story portico.

The house has been listed on the National Register of Historic Places since May 9, 1977.

References

Houses on the National Register of Historic Places in Tennessee
Greek Revival architecture in Tennessee
Houses completed in 1856
Houses in Memphis, Tennessee